Perettiite-(Y) is a complex silicate–borate mineral with the formula Y2Mn4FeSi2B8O24. It was first discovered in 2015 by Adolf Peretti of the Gemresearch Swisslab (GRS). It was found as inclusions in a phenakite crystal from Mogok, Myanmar.

Perettiite-(Y) was approved for IMA (International Mineralogical Association) status in 2015.

References

Silicate minerals
Borate minerals
Orthorhombic minerals
Minerals in space group 53
Borosilicates
Yttrium minerals
Manganese minerals